Lyon Township is a township in Geary County, Kansas, USA.  As of the 2000 census, its population was 298.

History
Lyon Township was established in 1877. It was named for Gen. Nathaniel Lyon.

Geography

The streams of Carry Creek, Lyon Creek, Otter Creek and Schuler Branch run through this township.

References

 USGS Geographic Names Information System (GNIS)

Further reading

External links
 City-Data.com

Townships in Geary County, Kansas
Townships in Kansas